Manuel Petrosyan (born May 6, 1998) is an Armenian chess player who holds the title of Grandmaster. He was the winner of 2022 Armenian Chess Championship.

He won the Under-18 World Youth Chess Championship in 2016 and finished second in the World Junior Chess Championship of 2017. 

In August 2018, he finished second in the Riga Technical University Open "A" tournament.

In 2020, he won the Stepan Avagyan Memorial.

References

External links

1998 births
Living people
Armenian chess players
Chess grandmasters
World Youth Chess Champions